Delhi Crime is an Indian crime drama streaming television series written and directed by Richie Mehta. casting director Radhesh More and produced by Golden Karaven, Ivanhoe Productions, Film Karavan and Poor Man's Productions. The series star Shefali Shah, Rasika Dugal, Adil Hussain and Rajesh Tailang. The first season is set in the aftermath of the 2012 Delhi gang rape. The second season focuses on the Chaddi Baniyan Gang.

Filming for the first season began in Delhi in January 2018, and was completed within 62 days. The series covers the period from the incident happening to the final arrest of the suspects.

Delhi Crime's first two episodes were premiered at the 2019 Sundance Film Festival in the Indie Episodic category. The series was released on Netflix on 22 March 2019. It received critical acclaim, with praise for its performances, writing, and depiction of the real-life case that inspired it. At the International Emmy Awards held in September 2020, Delhi Crime became the first Indian series to receive the award for Outstanding Drama Series. The show was renewed for a second season with the main cast returning. The second season premiered on 26 August 2022.

Synopsis 
Delhi Crime is based on the 2012 Delhi gang rape case that took place in the neighbourhood of Munirka, in South Delhi. The series follows the story in the aftermath of the gang rape, where Deputy Commissioner of Police (DCP) Vartika Chaturvedi is tasked to find the culprits responsible for the assaults and subsequent death of the female victim.

Cast

Main 
Shefali Shah as DCP Vartika Chaturvedi IPS
Rajesh Tailang as Inspector Bhupendra Singh
Rasika Dugal as Neeti Singh IPS
Adil Hussain as Kumar Vijay (CP)
 Kuldeep sareen as Inspector Viren Chaddha (season 2)

Recurring 
Denzil Smith as Vishal Chaturvedi, Vartika's husband
Yashaswini Dayama as Chandni "Chandu" Chaturvedi, Vartika and Vishal's daughter
Abhilasha Singh as Deepika, the victim of a brutal gang rape and murder
Sanjay Bishnoi as Akash Kumar, Deepika's friend who was also a victim of the attack
Vinod Sharawat as SHO Vinod Tiwari
Anurag Arora as Sub-Inspector Jairaj Singh
Gopal Datt as Sudhir Kumar
Sidharth Bhardwaj as SHO Shubhash Gupta
Aakash Dahiya as Devinder
Avijit Dutt as Gururaj Dixit
Jaya Bhattacharya as Vimla Bharadwaj (Season 1)
Swati Bhatia as Ira
Mridul Sharma as Jai Singh
Ayush Sehgal as Arunesh
Rhea Bedi as Smriti
Gaurav Rana as SHO Rakesh Verma
Govind Singh as Amar Singh
Vipin Katyal as Arif
Ashok Mehta as Lead Protester
Danish Husain as Advocate Vineet Singh (Season 2)
Tillotama Shome as Lata Solanki/Karishma (Season 2)
Jatin Goswami (Season 2)
Vyom Yadav (Season 2)
Ankit Sharma (Season 2)

Episodes

Season 1

Season 2

Production

Development 
Mehta decided to write a script based on the events during the 2012 Delhi gang rape and murder incident. He then conceived the idea of Delhi Crime during a conversation with Neeraj Kumar, the former Commissioner of the Delhi Police, who introduced him to the investigating team and provided access to several legal documents that were prepared as part of the investigation. Later on, Kumar asked Mehta if he would consider making a film on the case to which he denied. He then started reading the documents and was "amazed at the precision with which this case was solved, and so quickly." He also met the officers involved in the case and was "blown away by them." Mehta also sought permission from the victim's family. He said that films like The French Connection (1971) and Zodiac (2007) influenced his approach.

He modeled several portrayals of the cops based on his own observations. Mehta said that the making of the series was a "personally transformative journey" for him. He spoke to several police personnel involved in the case and tried "retracing the paths that the police took during the course of the investigation." It took Mehta six years to finish his research, adding that the writing part of the film which began in 2014 took place for more than four years, since he had to meet the cops and had to return to Canada to put his research work altogether, which took him more time. Mehta initially wanted to make it as a feature film, but as he continued the research, he realised that he could not fit the content in that length.

Casting 
The casting director of the series is Mukesh Chhabra. Mehta decided to focus on actors from theatre background, without being influenced by the need to have recognised faces from Hindi film industry. Shefali Shah, Rajesh Tailang, Adil Hussain and Rasika Dugal were a part of the prominent cast members in the series, with whom Mehta worked in their first feature film Amal (2007). When Mehta spoke to Chhabra he stated that he had a little time to process the completion, so Mehta did not agree to cast star actors in the series, which unleashed Chhabra's imagination. He also added that the rise of streaming platforms had given much recognition to "some of the best acting talent in the world that comes from India".

The character of Vartika Chaturvedi (Shefali Shah) was based on Chhaya Sharma, the former deputy commissioner of police in Delhi. Mehta met Sharma, who was in the team who caught the perpetrators. They spoke for months as Mehta wanted her point of view in the crime. Shefali Shah agreed to don the character after Mehta's narration spanned for five minutes and also met Sharma for the preparation of the role. Tailang's character was an amalgamation of different investigating officers, but he spoke to one police officer and used him as reference point.

Filming 
The series spans six days, covering the period between 16 December and 21 December 2012, from the incident to the final arrest. The film went on floors in Delhi in January 2018 after taking permission from the Delhi police and the victim's family, and was shot over the course of 62 days. Mehta decided not to show the rape on screen as he wanted "not to cross that line into exploitation." To make the experience more cathartic for the audience, director Richie Mehta revealed that they used handheld cameras on purpose. He says, "We wanted the audience like they are a part of our narrative and all that was happening on the sets. To make them feel more inclusive, we have shot those scenes with a handheld camera."

The shooting commenced in Delhi, mostly on the roads and no sets were used. Neeraj Kumar, for whom Mehta conceived the idea of the script stated that he advised the producers not to involve my successors who would neither approve of the project nor would they give any support, since the case was their predecessor's — a common failing observed in the police. Thus, the entire shoot was done almost without formal permissions.

Before the shoot, Kumar called the entire cast including Shefali Shah, to brief them about police hierarchy, the rank structure, body language of the police and the works so as to find the series to be an authentic depiction of the police on account of these briefings. Kumar has not visited the shooting spot, with the exception of one scene at the India Gate because his visits to the locales would have spread the word that he was getting Delhi Crime being made for his glorification.

Release 
The first two episodes of the series was premiered at the 2019 Sundance Film Festival at the Indie Episodic Category, held on 23 January to 3 February 2019. Netflix acquired the streaming rights of the show later, and on 14 February, with the official announcement of their new original contents (including series and films) for their 2019 original slate, the makers confirmed their scheduled release of 22 March 2019. The official trailer of this series was unveiled on 11 March 2019. The show was released on Netflix on 22 March.

Delhi Crime season 2's official trailer was released on 8 August 2022.

Reception

Season 1
The first season received universal acclaim upon its release. On Rotten Tomatoes, the series has an approval rating of 92% based on 12 reviews, with an average rating of 7.25/10.

Daniel Fienberg of The Hollywood Reporter called it "consistently different enough to be interesting." He also felt the police-procedural conventions felt "reasonably fresh and consistently engaging." Ben Travers of IndieWire wrote: "An expertly told, hard-to-watch true crime series, Delhi Crime Story won't be for everyone — but it won't let go of anyone who watches." Shubhra Gupta of The Indian Express wrote: "Where Delhi Crime scores is in the portrayal of a beleaguered police force, which is easy to point fingers at."

Saibal Chatterjee of NDTV called the series "grim, gritty and grounded in the everyday." He further wrote: "Delhi Crime is a knockout punch of a series: unsettling and enthralling by turns." Piyasree Dasgupta of HuffPost noted that the series "comes across as such an elaborate exercise to valorise the Delhi Police that it actually seems deeply insensitive." She also said that the "only people the show humanises are the police." Rahul Desai of Film Companion wrote: "It's the tiny infusions of well-informed opinion into what is essentially dramatic long-read reportage that make Delhi Crime one hell of a ride." Rohan Naahar of Hindustan Times called it: " gut-wrenching, stylishly directed, passionately performed, and most important, not at all exploitative." Avinash Ramachandran of The New Indian Express – Cinema Express in his review wrote: "Delhi Crime might be a glorification of the police force, but it is also a mirror to our society. It might absolve the Delhi police of its alleged dereliction of duties, but it is also a reminder that we vouched, and hoped, for a similar incident to never happen again."

Along with the story telling and the premise of the series, the cast also received widespread appreciation for their performances in the series. Priyanka Roy of The Telegraph said: "And while the rest of it is worth a watch, Shefali Shah is reason number one why you shouldn't give Delhi Crime a miss." Nandini Ramnath from Scroll wrote: " Rajesh Tailang, Anurag Arora, Adil Hussain, Jaya Bhattacharya, Gopal Dutt and Vinod Sharawat are among the numerous actors who display the same dedication to their craft as did their fictionalised selves to the investigation." Namrata Joshi from The Hindu said: "Tailang's control, poise and measured way plays out beautifully against Shah's dynamism to give us arguably the best on-screen buddy-cop team seen yet in India."

Season 2
American filmmaker Tanuj Chopra takes over the reins as a director from Richie and doesn’t miss a beat. He keeps the sensibility American (non-dramatic), heart Indian and retains the pulse of the series while recreating the unnerving tension. Taking off from the previous season, his storytelling allows each character a natural progression and voice. There’s an unsaid ease between people, synchronized disputes as guards are dropped following the passage of time. The best scene of the series sees Vartika and her subordinate Bhupinder (Rajesh Tailang) concerned over Delhi’s growing crime rate and suddenly switching to their lack of work-life balance. They inquire about each other’s families briefly, before switching back to the case details. Time doesn’t permit them even a moment of calm and digression. 

Based on a chapter from former Commissioner of Delhi Police, Neeraj Kumar’s book, season 2 takes us back into the dark alleys and criminal underbelly of Delhi. While the violence isn’t suppressed, the gaze is more sensitive than exploitative. The angst is towards the crime, not the criminal. The handheld camera movement (by DOP David Bolen) in chase sequences shot at night and music by Ceiri Torjussen add to the atmospherics. An effective production design along with hard-hitting dialogue by Sanyuktha Chawla and Virat Basoya set the pace from the get-go. Writing by Mayank Tewari and co-writer Ensia Mirza is interesting. It makes you watch these cops from afar as well as become a part of the investigation. 

https://timesofindia.indiatimes.com/web-series/reviews/hindi/delhi-crime/season-2/seasonreview/93635625.cms

Based on  Moon Gazer, a chapter from ex-top cop Neeraj Kumar’s book   Khaki Files, the moral dilemmas that have been woven into the narrative gives the series its sharp claws that scratches the conscience. Can an entire tribe be castigated for the transgressions of a few? Creator Richie Mehta even uses his surname to put the point across. Is the increasing social divide responsible for the surge in the crime rate? Do people living on the margins of society have a right to snatch the ill-gotten money of the corrupt among the elite to fulfil their aspirations? Can the police, always under political pressure, rewrite the narrative set by the news hounds who have a daily deadline to meet? There are no easy answers. Director Tanuj Chopra is not aiming for a lecture on crime and its causes, but the form consistently gives a feeling that the crime procedural has the heartbeat of a nuanced documentary. 

David Bolen’s cinematography and Ceiri Torjussen’s music bring the dread into living rooms, and the brooding atmospherics add to the top-rate performances.     

https://www.thehindu.com/entertainment/movies/delhi-crime-season-2-series-review-chasing-the-moons-shadow/article65813809.ece

Technical Aspects:

Technically, the show is top-notch. The background score by Ceiri Torjussen is terrific and ideally in sync with the theme of the series. The cinematography by David Bolen is superb and adds to the viewing experience.

Editing by Antara Lahiri is crisp. The writers Mayank Tiwari and Shubra Swarup have done an awesome job in coming up with a largely engaging and gripping series. Tanuj Chopra’s direction is equally good and he managed to extract first-rate performances from the actors. He delivered big with one of the most anticipated sequels which is an uphill task.

https://www.123telugu.com/reviews/ott-review-delhi-crime-season-2-telugu-series-on-netflix.html

Awards and nominations

References

External links 
 

Hindi-language Netflix original programming
Indian anthology television series
Indian crime television series
Television shows set in Delhi
2019 Indian television series debuts
Indian drama television series
Indian television series distributed by Netflix
Law enforcement in fiction
True crime television series
Police procedural television series
Gang rape in fiction
Fictional portrayals of the Delhi Police
Gang rape in India